Transition Korea (TK) is an anti-establishment political party in South Korea.

The party was established by Cho Jung-hoon and Lee Won-jae on 23 February 2020. It officially identifies as neither conservative nor progressive, but as pragmatic. Lee Won-jae, one of the co-Presidents, supports a basic income.

In the 2020 election, the party joined the Platform Party alliance, but at the beginning there were speculations that the party would form an alliance with the Minsaeng Party. Cho Jung-hoon ran 6th in the Platform Party list and was elected. On 12 May 2020, Cho was officially expelled from the Platform Party and returned to this party.

References

External links 
 Official website

2020 establishments in South Korea
Centrist parties in Asia
Liberal parties in South Korea
Political parties established in 2020
Political parties in South Korea